Jemal Kurshubadze (born 22 April 1997) is a Belarusian professional footballer. As of 2020, he plays for Smolevichi.

References

External links 
 
 

1997 births
Living people
Belarusian footballers
Belarus under-21 international footballers
Association football goalkeepers
FC Minsk players
FC Isloch Minsk Raion players
FC Smolevichi players